Goethe University Frankfurt is a university located in Frankfurt am Main, Germany. It was founded in 1914 as a citizens' university, which means it was founded and funded by the wealthy and active liberal citizenry of Frankfurt. The original name in German was Universität Frankfurt am Main. In 1932, the university's name was extended in honour of one of the most famous native sons of Frankfurt, the poet, philosopher and writer/dramatist Johann Wolfgang von Goethe. The university currently has around 45,000 students, distributed across four major campuses within the city.

The university celebrated its 100th anniversary in 2014. The first female president of the university, Birgitta Wolff, was sworn into office in 2015, and was succeeded by Enrico Schleiff in 2021. 20 Nobel Prize winners have been affiliated with the university, including Max von Laue and Max Born. The university is also affiliated with 18 winners of the Gottfried Wilhelm Leibniz Prize.

Goethe University is part of the IT cluster Rhine-Main-Neckar. The Johannes Gutenberg University Mainz, the Goethe University Frankfurt and the Technische Universität Darmstadt together form the Rhine-Main-Universities (RMU).

History

The historical roots of the university can be traced back as far as 1484, when a City Council Library was established with a bequest from the patrician Ludwig von Marburg. Merged with other collections, it was renamed City Library in 1668 and became the university library in 1914. Depending on the country, the date of foundation is recorded differently. According to Anglo-American calculations, the founding date of Goethe University would be 1484. In Germany, the date on which the right to award doctorates is granted is considered the founding year of a university.

The modern history of the University of Frankfurt can be dated to 28 September 1912, when the foundation contract for the "Königliche Universität zu Frankfurt am Main" (Royal University at Frankfurt on the Main) was signed at the Römer, Frankfurt's town hall. Royal permission for the university was granted on 10 June 1914, and the first enrollment of students began on 16 October 1914. Members of Frankfurt's Jewish community, including the Speyer family, Wilhelm Ralph Merton, and the industrialists Leo Gans and Arthur von Weinberg donated two thirds of the foundation capital of the  University of Frankfurt.

The university has been best known historically for its Institute for Social Research (founded 1924), the institutional home of the Frankfurt School, a preeminent 20th-century school of philosophy and social thought. Some of the well-known scholars associated with this school include Theodor Adorno, Max Horkheimer, and Jürgen Habermas, as well as Herbert Marcuse, Erich Fromm, and Walter Benjamin . Other well-known scholars at the University of Frankfurt include the sociologist Karl Mannheim, the philosopher Hans-Georg Gadamer, the philosophers of religion Franz Rosenzweig, Martin Buber, and Paul Tillich, the psychologist Max Wertheimer, and the sociologist Norbert Elias .
The University of Frankfurt has at times been considered liberal, or left-leaning, and has had a reputation for Jewish and Marxist (or even Jewish-Marxist) scholarship . During the Nazi period, "almost one third of its academics and many of its students were dismissed for racial and/or political reasons—more than at any other German university" . The university also played a major part in the German student movement of 1968.

The university also has been influential in the natural sciences and medicine, with Nobel Prize winners including Max von Laue and Max Born, and breakthroughs such as the Stern–Gerlach experiment.

In recent years, the university has focused in particular on law, history, and economics, creating new institutes, such as the Institute for Law and Finance (ILF) and the Center for Financial Studies (CFS) . One of the university's ambitions is to become Germany's leading university for finance and economics, given the school's proximity to one of Europe's financial centers. In cooperation with Duke University's Fuqua School of Business, the Goethe Business School offers an MBA program. Goethe University has established an international award for research in financial economics, the Deutsche Bank Prize in Financial Economics.

Organization

The university consists of 16 faculties. Ordered by their sorting number, these are:
 01. Rechtswissenschaft (Law)
 02. Wirtschaftswissenschaften (Economics and Business Administration)
 03. Gesellschaftswissenschaften (Social Sciences)
 04. Erziehungswissenschaften (Educational Sciences)
 05. Psychologie und Sportwissenschaften (Psychology and Sports Sciences)
 06. Evangelische Theologie (Protestant Theology)
 07. Katholische Theologie (Roman Catholic Theology)
 08. Philosophie und Geschichtswissenschaften (Philosophy and History)
 09. Sprach- und Kulturwissenschaften (Faculty of Linguistics, Cultures, and Arts)
 10. Neuere Philologien (Modern Languages)
 11. Geowissenschaften/Geographie (Geosciences and Geography)
 12. Informatik und Mathematik (Computer Science and Mathematics)
 13. Physik (Physics)
 14. Biochemie, Chemie und Pharmazie (Biochemistry, Chemistry and Pharmacy)
 15. Biowissenschaften (Biological Sciences)
 16. Medizin (Medical Science)

In addition, there are several co-located research institutes of the Max Planck Society:
 Max Planck Institute of Biophysics
 Max Planck Institute for Brain Research
 Max Planck Institute for European Legal History

Campuses

The university is located across four campuses in Frankfurt am Main:

 Campus Westend: 
Headquarters of the university, also housing Social sciences, Pedagogy, Psychology, Theology, Philosophy, History, Philology, Archaeology, Law, Economics and Business Administration, Human geography

 Campus Bockenheim: 
University library, Mathematics, Computer science, Art history, Fine Arts

 Campus Riedberg: 
Pharmacy, Physics, Chemistry, Biochemistry, Biology, Geosciences and Geography

 Campus Niederrad: 
Medical science, dentistry, university hospital

 Campus Ginnheim:

Sports.

Campus Westend
"Campus Westend" of the university is dominated by the IG Farben Building by architect Hans Poelzig, an example of the modernist New Objectivity style. The style for the IG Farben Building was originally chosen as "a symbol for the scientific and mercantile German manpower, made out of iron and stone", as the IG Farben director at the time of construction, Baron von Schnitzler, stated in his opening speech in October 1930.

After the university took over the complex, new buildings were added to the campus. On 30 May 2008, the House of Finance relocated to a new building designed by the architects Kleihues+Kleihues, following the style of the IG Farben Building. The upper floors of the House of Finance building have several separate offices as well as shared office space for researchers and students. The ground floor is open to the public and welcomes visitors with a spacious, naturally lit foyer that leads to lecture halls, seminar rooms, and the information center, a 24-hour reference library. The ground floor also accommodates computer rooms and a café. The floors, walls and ceiling of the foyer are decorated with a grid design that is continued throughout the entire building. The flooring is inspired by Raphael's mural, The School of Athens.

Goethe Business School
The Goethe Business School is a graduate business school at the university, established in 2004, part of the House of Finance at the Westend Campus and the IKB building. it is a non-profit foundation under private law held by the university. The chairman of the board at Goethe Business School, Rolf E. Breuer, is former chairman of the supervisory board of Deutsche Bank . Goethe Business School has a partnership in Executive Education with the Indian School of Business (ISB) in Hyderabad .

The Deutsche Bank Prize
The Deutsche Bank Prize in Financial Economics honors renowned researchers who have made influential contributions to the fields of finance and money and macroeconomics, and whose work has led to practical and policy-relevant results. It is awarded biannually, since 2005, by the Center for Financial Studies, in partnership with Goethe University Frankfurt. The award carries an endowment of €50,000, which is donated by the Stiftungsfonds Deutsche Bank im Stifterverband für die Deutsche Wissenschaft.

Notable alumni (partial list)
 Theodor W. Adorno (1903–1969), double Ordinarius of philosophy and sociology and member of the Frankfurt School
 Max Horkheimer, member of the Frankfurt School
 Alex Karp, co-founder of Palantir Technologies and American billionaire
 Jürgen Habermas, sociologist and a philosopher
 Hans Bethe, theoretical physicist (Nobel Prize 1967)
 Max Born, theoretical physicist and mathematician (Nobel Prize 1954)
 Paul Ehrlich, Nobel Prize Winner 1908
 Walter Gerlach, theoretical physicist
 Walter Hallstein (1901–1982), first President of the European Commission
 Helmut Kiener, psychologist turned investment professional, founder of the ponzi scheme K1 fund
 Vladimir Košak, economist, lawyer, politician and diplomat
 Josef Mengele, officer and a physician in the Nazi concentration camp Auschwitz
 Oskar Dirlewanger, officer, who served as the founder and commander of the infamous Nazi SS penal unit "Dirlewanger" during World War II
 Boudewijn Sirks, Professor of the History of Ancient Law from 1997 to 2005, later Regius Professor of Civil Law at Oxford
 Walter Greiner, theoretical physicist in high energy physics
 Alfred Schmidt, philosopher and translator
 Horst Stöcker, theoretical physicist
 Alexander R. Todd, Baron Todd, chemist
 Luciano Rezzolla, theoretical astrophysicist
 Hannah Elfner, Head of Simulations at the Helmholtz Centre for Heavy Ion Research and Professor of Physics at the Goethe University Frankfurt
 Alexander T. Sack, neuroscientist and cognitive psychologist
 Helma Wennemers, German organic chemist and professor
 Nancy Faeser, German politician
 Nina Eisenhardt (born 1990), German politician
 Hans-Hermann Hoppe, German author and economist

Nobel Prize winners (alumni and faculty)
 Paul Ehrlich: 1908 Nobel Prize for Physiology or Medicine
 Max von Laue: 1914 Nobel Prize for Physics
 Otto Loewi: 1914 Nobel Prize for Physiology or Medicine
 Paul Karrer: 1937 Nobel Prize for Chemistry
 Otto Stern: 1943 Nobel Prize for Physics
 Max Born: 1954 Nobel Prize for Physics
 Alexander Robertus Todd: 1957 Nobel Prize for Chemistry
 Karl Ziegler: 1963 Nobel Prize for Chemistry
 Hans Bethe: 1967 Nobel Prize for Physics
 Niels Kaj Jerne: 1984 Nobel Prize for Physiology or Medicine
 Gerd Binnig: 1986 Nobel Prize for Physics
 Jean-Marie Lehn: 1987 Nobel Prize for Chemistry
 Hartmut Michel: 1988 Nobel Prize for Chemistry
 Reinhard Selten: 1994 Nobel Prize for Economics
 Christiane Nüsslein-Volhard: 1995 Nobel Prize for Physiology or Medicine
 Horst Ludwig Störmer: 1998 Nobel Prize for Physics
 Günter Blobel: 1999 Nobel Prize for Physiology or Medicine
 Peter Grünberg: 2007 Nobel Prize for Physics

World rankings

The New York Times: Among the World's 10 best universities by employer choice. Goethe University was ranked 10 out of 150 universities in 2012.
ARWU World (Shanghai Rankings): 101–150
 QS World University Rankings: 279

Points of interest
Botanischer Garten der Goethe-Universität Frankfurt am Main, a botanical garden
 IG Farben Building

See also

 Frankfurt University Library
 List of modern universities in Europe (1801–1945)

References

External links

University homepage 
Verified University Twitter account (in German)
Official University Instagram account (in German)

 
Educational institutions established in 1914
Johann Wolfgang von Goethe
1914 establishments in Germany
Universities and colleges in Frankfurt